Satellite Island lies in Prevost Harbor on the north side of Stuart Island in the San Juan Islands of San Juan County, Washington, United States. Two of the camps, Sunset Camp and Fellowship Camp, are used for overnight island trips by campers from YMCA Camp Orkila and are located on the western half of the island. Islander Camp is located on the east side of the island, and is used primarily by the Islander Teen Expedition, a kayaking trip which crosses into Canada's Gulf Islands. Mariner Camp is located on the east side of the island, near Islander Camp, and is used by the Mariner Teen Expedition, a sailing trip for teenagers.

Satellite Island commemorates the ship (HMS Satellite) captained by the British naval officer James Charles Prevost, who was stationed at Vancouver Island from 1857 to 1860.

References

Satellite Island: Block 4010, Census Tract 9603, San Juan County, Washington United States Census Bureau

San Juan Islands
YMCA
Private islands of Washington (state)
Uninhabited islands of Washington (state)